Emmanuel Maboang Kessack (born 27 November 1968) is a retired Cameroonian international football player.

Career
Among the clubs he played for included Canon Yaoundé, Portimonense S.C. and Rio Ave F.C. of Portugal, and Pelita Jaya of Indonesia. He also participated at the 1990 FIFA World Cup and 1994 FIFA World Cup.

References

External sources
Stats from Portugal at TerceiroAnel.

1968 births
Living people
Cameroonian footballers
Cameroonian expatriate footballers
Cameroon international footballers
Portimonense S.C. players
Rio Ave F.C. players
Liga Portugal 2 players
Expatriate footballers in Portugal
Expatriate footballers in Singapore
Expatriate footballers in Indonesia
Canon Yaoundé players
1990 FIFA World Cup players
1994 FIFA World Cup players
1990 African Cup of Nations players
1992 African Cup of Nations players
Association football midfielders
Pelita Bandung Raya players
Indonesian Premier Division players
Cameroonian expatriate sportspeople in Portugal
Cameroonian expatriate sportspeople in Singapore
Cameroonian expatriate sportspeople in Indonesia